The bistecca alla fiorentina (beefsteak Florentine style) is an Italian steak made of young steer (vitellone) or heifer (scottona) that, combined with the specific preparation, makes it one of the most popular dishes of Tuscan cuisine. It is a high cut including the bone, to be cooked on the embers or on the grill, with a degree of "blood" cooking ("al sangue").

History 

The history of the Florentine steak is as old as the Italian city of Florence, from which it takes its name, and the tracks of its origins are lost in time. However, its tradition, celebrity, and name can be traced back to the celebration of the feast of Saint Lawrence on 10 August and to the House of Medici. On the occasion of the Festa di San Lorenzo the city was illuminated by the light of large bonfires, where large quantities of veal were roasted and then distributed to the population.

Florence at the time of the Medici was an important crossroad where you could meet travelers from all over the world. It is said that on the occasion of the Feast of Saint Lawrence, some English knights were present at the celebrations and were offered the meat roasted on the fires. They called it in their language beef steak referring to the type of meat they were eating. From here, a translation adapted to the current Italian language created the word bistecca that has come down to the present day.

An alternative version dates it back to the English, present in Florence in the 19th century, who left their mark on Tuscan cuisine. These were wealthy people, who could also afford cuts of fine meat, such as beef steak, precisely, but also as the roast beef, also present in Florentine cuisine.

In the 1950s Florentine publisher Corrado Tedeschi founded the Italian Nettist Party, better known as the Steak Party (Partito della Bistecca). Considered a forerunner of anti-politics or the first Italian satirical party, the Steak Party took part in the 1953 Italian general election using the motto "Better a steak today than an empire tomorrow", promising to give people a 450 g steak every day.

Definition 

The Florentine steak is obtained from the cut of the sirloin (the part corresponding to the lumbar vertebrae, the half of the back on the side of the tail) of the calf of the Chianina breed: in the middle it has the "T" shaped bone, in fact it is also called T-bone steak, with the fillet on one side and the sirloin on the other.

The italian gastronomist Pellegrino Artusi, in his 1891 cooking manual Science in the Kitchen and the Art of Eating Well (La scienza in cucina e l'arte di mangiar bene), defines the cut of the steak as follows: "Florentine steak. From beef-steak, an English word that is worth the rib of an ox, came the name of our steak, which is nothing more than a chop with its bone, a finger or a finger and a half thick, cut from the sirloin of a steer".

According to Corrado Tedeschi, founder of the Steak Party, "to be truly such, a beefsteak must weigh at least 450 grams. If it weighs a kilo, so much the better. But no less than 450 grams, because otherwise it becomes a cutlet and then my party would no longer be the Beefsteak Party."

Preparation 

The meat - previously aged for at least two weeks in cold rooms - must be at room temperature at the time of cooking. The cut is about 1-1.5 kg, the height about 5–6 cm.

To heat the barbecue grill, a generous amount of charcoal embers, preferably oak, holm oak or olive, is used. The charcoal must be well alive, barely veiled by a light layer of ash, without flame. Plates, gas grills, electric grills, grills with refractory stone, etc. should be absolutely avoided. The meat must be at first be very close to the coals, so that an aromatic crust is formed as quickly as possible via the Maillard reaction, then after the first minute it must be raised to a gentler heat.

Put on top of the meat without seasoning, a fundamental operation to prevent it from hardening, it should be turned once, cooking it about 3–5 minutes per side, no more. Finally, it should be cooked "standing" on the side of the bone (the steak must be thick enough to stand alone), for 5/7 minutes, no longer, until the traces of blood disappear from the bone (which actually is not blood, but myoglobin, a protein). However, there is another school of cooking that says that meat should not be cooked standing up.

A good cooking is the secret of all the taste of this dish: the meat must be colored on the outside and red, soft and juicy on the inside, warm, but not cooked. For this reason, it should not be turned with the help of forks or any other kitchen tool that can penetrate the meat and break the crust that forms at the beginning of cooking. Instead, it must be turned, gently pinched, with the use of a suitable tool, as the tool can cause the leakage of precious "juices" that give flavor to the meat.

There is a third way of cooking, called "reverse searing", consisting of heating the piece of meat (in the barbecue or in a conventional oven) to a temperature of about 50 °C at the heart; then place the steak in a grill or pan (preferably in cast iron) previously heated (they must be hot) to create a brown tasty crust using the Maillard reaction. Finally, let the steak rest for 4–5 minutes and then serve, trying to cut against the fiber.

Traditional accompaniments are cannellini beans dressed in olive oil, or a salad. It should not be sprinkled with lemon. On the table, it goes well with a good red wine, like Chianti classico.

See also

Tuscan cuisine
Italian Nettist Party
 List of beef dishes
T-bone steak

References

Bibliography 

 Regione Toscana (a cura di), Viaggio in Toscana. Alla scoperta dei prodotti tipici, Firenze, Giunti, 2001, p. 127. .
 Paolo Petroni, Il libro della vera cucina fiorentina, Firenze, Il Centauro, 2004. .
 Sandro Pintus, Elogio della bistecca. La fiorentina dalla Chianina alla tavola. Storia, ricette, curiosità, 2ª edizione, StreetLib, 2016. Windows/Linux  - Mac (interattivo) id1027888456.

Cuisine of Tuscany
Beef steak dishes